Cora aspera is a species of basidiolichen in the family Hygrophoraceae. Found in Central and South America, it was formally described as a new species in 2013 by Karina Wilk, Robert Lücking, and Eduardo Morales. Here, in a Yungas cloud forest, it grows as an epiphyte on bark. The specific epithet alludes to the roughened texture of the thallus surface, especially under dry conditions. The lichen has been recorded from Costa Rica, Colombia, Ecuador, Bolivia, and Peru, and it grows on twigs and branches in montane rainforest and páramo vegetation.

References

aspera
Lichen species
Lichens described in 2013
Lichens of Central America
Lichens of South America
Taxa named by Robert Lücking
Basidiolichens